Independents' Day is a 2016 science fiction action film starring Fay Gauthier, Sal Landi and Johnny Rey Diaz made by The Asylum. In the tradition of most of The Asylum's catalog, Independent's Day is a mockbuster of the 1996 film Independence Day and its 2016 sequel Independence Day: Resurgence.

Plot
The alien Orions attack the planet as humans are deemed too violent. After blowing up many of the Earth's capital cities, they then heal many of the sick and offer to transport them; those who are hungry and others who wanted to go to another planet and many of the earthlings volunteer to go. An "Earth First" militia forms to fight the aliens, while the US Vice President (as the aliens have killed the President) negotiates with the aliens. The plot was noted to be convoluted.

Cast
 Fay Gauthier as President Raney
 Sal Landi as General Roundtree (Salvatore Garriola)
 Johnny Rey Diaz as Captain Goddard (Jonathan Ortiz)
 Matthew Riley as Bobby (Matthew Poalillo)
 Jon Edwin Wright as Senator Randall Raney (Jon Wright)
 Jude Lanston as Agent Taylor
 Jacquelin Arroyo as "Red" / Fighter Pilot
 William Castrogiovanni as Major Fry / Fighter Pilot
 Vishesh Chachra as Sergeante Cates
 Brian Tyler Cohen as Ari / Fighter Pilot
 Christos Kalabogias as Norman Reed
 Jes Selane as Kelly Reed
 Kurt Sinclair as President Oliver
 Jonathan Thomson as General Henderson
 Holger Moncada Jr. as Moncada

Reviews

Dread Central found the movie neither good nor bad.

References

External links
 

2016 films
2016 science fiction action films
Alien invasions in films
American science fiction action films
American independent films
The Asylum films
2016 independent films
2010s English-language films
2010s American films